James Leslie "Les" McMahon (26 February 1930 – 23 January 2015) was an Australian politician. Born in Sydney, he was a plumber, gasfitter and drainer and then an organiser for the Plumbers and Gasfitters Employees Union of Australia (NSW branch). He was elected to Sydney City Council in 1967, Leichhardt City Council in 1968, and Sydney City Council again in 1971.

In 1975, he was elected to the Australian House of Representatives as the Labor member for Sydney, a position he held until his retirement in 1983 after being deselected for the seat in favour of Peter Baldwin. During that time in Parliament, he had two full-time staff, he was on three Parliamentary Committees for Labor, namely, the Industry and Works Committee, Health Committee and Urban Committee. McMahon was also on three joint Parliamentary Committees in the Commonwealth Parliament, House of Parliament Committee, Road Safety Committee and Public Works Committee (where he was appointed Deputy President). McMahon was also the Deputy Chair of the Labor Caucus and Deputy Whip in Parliament. A few months after retiring from Politics in 1983, he was employed as a Commissioner of the NSW Conciliation and Arbitration Commission, where he remained until he retired from work in 1993.

On 11 February 2015, the Australian Federal Parliament observed a moment of silence in honor of McMahon following his death. The current sitting Labor member of the Federal seat of Sydney, Ms Tanya Plibersek described McMahon as "a man of strong convictions" and quoted:

Biography
In 1952, McMahon married Patricia Wellings. McMahon and Patricia were married for 60 years before Patricia's death in 2013. They had 8 children, 24 grandchildren and 16 great-grandchildren.

In 2013, McMahon's grandson Lee McMahon, wrote a biography of McMahon's life. The story is told pretty much in McMahon's own words from his perspective because the Commonwealth Parliament Oral History Project interviewed McMahon in 1989 at the age of 59, just six years after his retirement. McMahon died on 23 January 2015 in Sydney from prostate cancer.

References

Australian Labor Party members of the Parliament of Australia
Members of the Australian House of Representatives for Sydney
Members of the Australian House of Representatives
1930 births
2015 deaths
Gasfitters
Australian plumbers
20th-century Australian politicians
Australian builders